Bagi may refer to:

 Baki, Awdal, Somaliland
 Bagi, the Italian name of the titular see of Bageis
 Bagi, the Monster of Mighty Nature, a 1984 Japanese anime film by Osamu Tezuka, or its titular character

See also
 Baghi (disambiguation)